Käru River is a river in Põlva and Rapla County, Estonia. The river is 72.4 km long and basin size is 315.5 km2. It runs from Aeli Lake into Pärnu River.

References

Rivers of Estonia
Järva County
Rapla County